|}

The Hyde Novices' Hurdle is a Grade 2 National Hunt hurdle race in Great Britain which is open to horses aged four years or older. It is run on the Old Course at Cheltenham over a distance of about 2 miles and 5 furlongs (4,225 metres), and during its running there are ten hurdles to be jumped. The race is for novice hurdlers, and it is scheduled to take place each year in November.

The event was given its present name when it attained Grade 2 status in 2008. Prior to this it had been run at a lower grade under various titles. From 2010 to 2016 the race was sponsored by Neptune Investment Management and run as the Neptune Investment Management Novices' Hurdle. Since 2017 it has been sponsored by the Ballymore Group and run as the Ballymore Novices' Hurdle.

The race was first run in 1996.

Winners

See also
 Horse racing in Great Britain
 List of British National Hunt races

References
 Racing Post:

 pedigreequery.com – Hyde Novices' Hurdle – Cheltenham.

National Hunt races in Great Britain
Cheltenham Racecourse
National Hunt hurdle races
Recurring sporting events established in 1996
1996 establishments in England